Aron Keith Barbey (born January 6, 1977) is an American cognitive neuroscientist, who investigates the neural architecture of human intelligence and brain plasticity.
Barbey is the Emanuel Donchin Professorial Scholar of Psychology and a Professor of Psychology, Neuroscience, and Bioengineering at the University of Illinois.
He is director of the Decision Neuroscience Laboratory at the Beckman Institute for Advanced Science and Technology, and 
founding director of the Center for Brain Plasticity at the Beckman Institute, where he leads the Intelligence, Learning, and Plasticity (ILP) Initiative. 

He has used both classical lesion methods and functional magnetic resonance imaging (fMRI) techniques to better understand neural architecture and its relationship to intelligence.  Barbey used lesion mapping  to study Vietnam veterans who had suffered brain trauma.  He was able to record diagnostic images of their brains and relate this anatomical data to their documented problems, creating a "brain atlas" linking cognitive functions to neural organization. 
He has suggested a framework called “structured event complex theory” that describes the inferential architecture of the prefrontal cortex.

His research group examines the effects of physical fitness, nutrition and cognitive neuroscience interventions (including TDCS) on brain health and intelligence across the human lifespan.
In 2019, Barbey was awarded the Mensa Foundation Prize for his neuroscientific work studying human intelligence.

Education and career 
Aron Barbey received a B.A. from the University of Texas at Dallas in 1999, and a Ph.D. in Psychology from Emory University, Atlanta, Georgia in 2007.

From 2007-2011 Barbey was a Postdoctoral Fellow in the Cognitive Neuroscience Section of the National Institute of Neurological Disorders and Stroke at the National Institutes of Health, Bethesda, Maryland.
There he studied Vietnam veterans affected by brain trauma. They experienced differential deficits depending on the locations and size  of their injuries. Barbey also served as an adjunct professor of psychology at Georgetown University, Washington, DC beginning in 2008.

In 2011 Barbey was appointed to the College of Applied Health Sciences at the University of Illinois, and became an Institute Affiliate of the Beckman Institute for Advanced Science and Technology.
By 2012, he was the director of the Decision Neuroscience Laboratory at the Beckman Institute.
In 2018, the Center for Brain Plasticity at the Beckman Institute was formed, under the leadership of co-directors Aron Barbey and Neal J. Cohen, leaders of the center's Intelligence, Learning, and Plasticity (ILP) Initiative.

Professional Activities 

Aron Barbey is Associate Editor of Frontiers in Human Neuroscience. Barbey is also on the Editorial Boards of NeuroImage, Intelligence, and Thinking & Reasoning.
He is a co-editor of the Cambridge Handbook of Intelligence and Cognitive Neuroscience (2021).

Research

Cognitive Neuroscience of Human Intelligence 

Barbey’s research investigates the effects of human brain damage on   intellectual  and social functions, with particular emphasis on the prefrontal cortex. 

Studies of patients with frontal lobe damage have a long history in the neuroscience of intelligence and provide a direct way to test whether regions in the prefrontal cortex are necessary for specific intellectual abilities. However, it was only recently that the limited applicability and specificity of small sample studies of focal brain damage were overcome by contemporary lesion mapping approaches. 
 	
In a series of studies, 
Barbey's research group investigated almost 200 patients with focal brain injuries and mapped the architecture of executive, social, and emotional brain systems. His research has helped to identify and characterize the neural systems underlying general intelligence,	
emotional intelligence,
social intelligence,
fluid intelligence, 
working memory,
cognitive flexibility,	
and discourse comprehension.

Barbey's research has also revealed molecular genetic markers that predict general intelligence following traumatic brain injury.

Cognitive Neuroscience Methods to Enhance Human Intelligence 
	 
A central goal of Barbey's research is to establish and validate cognitive neuroscience-directed interventions to enhance human intelligence. Barbey is the Principal Investigator of the IARPA-sponsored INSIGHT project, along with co-investigators Arthur F. Kramer, Neal J. Cohen, and Charles H. Hillman.

Network Neuroscience Theory of Human Intelligence  

Barbey has proposed a Network Neuroscience Theory of Human Intelligence that emphasizes brain plasticity, in which "general intelligence reflects individual differences in the efficiency and flexibility of brain networks" and "the capacity to integrate information across the brain as a whole". According to this view, "crystallized intelligence" involves the ability to rapidly access existing representations of knowledge and experience while "fluid intelligence" involves the ability to solve novel problems in ways that are adaptive and flexible.

Funding
Barbey's Decision Neuroscience Laboratory is supported by large-scale private and federal research grants and contracts, including the Air Force Research Laboratory (AFRL), President Obama's White House BRAIN Initiative, the Director of National Intelligence's research agency, IARPA,
and contracts for $10 million from Defense Advanced Research Projects Agency (DARPA) for the study of individual optimization of human performance in the U.S. military using artificial intelligence.

Selected books

Selected papers

References

External links 
 Decision Neuroscience Laboratory
 Illinois Research Profile
 ResearchGate

1977 births
Place of birth missing (living people)
Living people
American cognitive neuroscientists
Emory University alumni
University of Illinois faculty
University of Texas at Dallas alumni